The Painshawfield, Batt House and Birches Nook Estate is a housing estate in the village of Stocksfield in Northumberland, England. It is commonly known as the Painshawfield Estate, being named after one of the three farms on whose land the Estate was built in the years following 1895.

Governance 
Painshawfield is in the parliamentary constituency of Hexham.

References

Villages in Northumberland